Michael Chow may refer to:

 Michael Chow (restaurateur) (born 1939), restaurateur and part-time actor
 Michael Chow (actor) (born 1960), Hong Kong based actor